Roberto Coelho Rocha (born August 4, 1965) is a Brazilian politician. He became a Federal Senator from Maranhão on February 1, 2015.

References

1965 births
Liberal Party (Brazil, 1985) politicians
Brazilian Democratic Movement politicians
Brazilian Social Democracy Party politicians
Brazilian Socialist Party politicians
Brazilian Labour Party (current) politicians
Living people
Members of the Federal Senate (Brazil)
People from São Luís, Maranhão